Tredegar Square pronounced  is a well-preserved Georgian square in Mile End, and is in the London Borough of Tower Hamlets. The square has gardens in the centre with lawns and large trees.

Location

Tredegar Square is 90 metres north of main commercial thoroughfare of the district, Mile End Road. Six roads branch off the square including one sharing its name starting about 120 metres east of Mile End tube station.

Architecture
In pale brown brick, three unbroken terraces line the square, with long continuous white cornices, sash windows, fanlights, railings in front of basements and bold, traditional single-colour doors.  All windows are white framed and a stucco white frame fronts the central houses of one of these three rows. The north is the exception, with similar shaped houses or sets of subdivided houses; these have white, ashlar-faced fronts or genuine large carved stone block facings, black railings on white-painted concrete and heavily porticoed, projecting and recessed features — for example, pediments above a feature window in the few recesses.  The level of complex forms and white stone-like appearance resembles many of the blocks in Belgravia and Bayswater.

History

The square takes its name from the landowner, Sir Charles Morgan, 2nd Baronet Tredegar, and his family estate Tredegar House near Newport, South Wales. One block north of the square is the Lord Tredegar public house and one block east The Morgan Arms on Morgan Street.

The south and west sides of the square were completed in the 1830s, and the rest by 1847.

The industrial town of Tredegar in South Wales also takes its name from the Tredegar estate, following the establishment in the area of The Tredegar Iron Company in 1800, on land owned by the Morgan family.

Coborn School campus named after square

Prisca Coborn (1622–1701), the widow of a Bow brewer, left property in Bow, Stratford, and Bocking (Essex) to maintain a school for not more than 50 poor children at Bow; the boys were to learn reading, writing, and accounts, and the girls reading, writing, and needlework.  An expansion plan in 1873, to day-school 200 boys and 200 girls (in adjoining buildings) meant the Bocking estate was sold and part of the proceeds used to purchase and extend a building "in Tredegar Square", however clearly shown on the map as narrowly beyond its north-west corner, also known as Stepney Grammar School. The school did not prosper on its own in its new surroundings, and by 1884 was in financial difficulties; the girls' school temporarily closed and a merger took place within a decade. In 1898 Coborn School was moved to 29–31 Bow Road, where it remained until the move to Upminster in 1971, initial plans of which had been well advanced in 1963.

Restoration after damage in the London Blitz
The Tredegar Square Conservation Area was established in 1971, after the square had become neglected prior to World War II; the area surrounding it was badly damaged by bombing during the war.

References

External links

 Panoramic view of the Square
 History of the area

Squares in the London Borough of Tower Hamlets
Mile End